Idalino Manuel Mendes was the Angolan minister for industry in the 1994 government of José Eduardo dos Santos.

References

Living people
Year of birth missing (living people)
Place of birth missing (living people)
Industry ministers of Angola
20th-century Angolan politicians